Årets Järnkamin (literally Iron Stove of the Year) is an award given to a Djurgårdens IF player, or coach, voted by the members of the official supporter club Järnkaminerna (The Iron Stoves). A person whom they felt represented the core value of being a true 'Järnkamin' (Iron Stove). It is awarded in both football and ice hockey.

Winners

Football 

 1993 –   Kristoffer Kindbom
 1994 –   Daniel Martinez
 1995 –   Thor André Olsen
 1998 –   Michael Borgqvist
 1999 –   Patrik Eriksson-Ohlsson
 2000 –   Mikael Dorsin
 2001 –   Stefan Rehn
 2002 –   Kim Källström
 2003 –   Markus Karlsson
 2004 –   Tobias Hysén
 2005 –   Johan Arneng
 2006 –   Pa Dembo Touray
 2007 –   Siggi Jónsson
 2008 –   Daniel Sjölund
 2009 –   Markus Johannesson
 2010 –   Pa Dembo Touray (2)
 2011 –   Mattias Jonson
 2012 –   James Keene
 2013 –   Amadou Jawo
 2014 –   Kenneth Høie
 2015 –   Kerim Mrabti
 2016 – The award was not given due to poor performance & 5/5 derby losses.
 2017 –   Magnus Eriksson
 2018 –   Andreas Isaksson
 2019 –   Tommi Vaiho
 2020 –   Haris Radetinac
 2021 –   Magnus Eriksson (2)
 2022 –   Haris Radetinac (2)

Ice hockey

 1999–00 –  Mikael Tellqvist
 2000–01 –  Mikael Tellqvist (2)
 2001–02 –  Nils Ekman
 2002–03 –  Joaquin Gage
 2003–04 –  Niklas Wikegård
 2004–05 –  Dan Boyle
 2005–06 –  Jimmie Ölvestad
 2006–07 –  Fredrik Bremberg
 2007–08 –  Ossi Väänänen
 2008–09 –  Marcus Ragnarsson
 2009–10 –  Jimmie Ölvestad (2)
 2010–11 –  Christian Eklund
 2011–12 –  Gustaf Wesslau
 2012–13 –  Kristofer Ottosson
 2013–14 –  Michael Holmqvist
 2014–15 –  Marcus Sörensen
 2015–16 –  Patrick Thoresen
 2016-17 –  Daniel Brodin
 2017-18 –  Adam Reideborn
 2018-19 –  Daniel Brodin (2)
 2019-20 –  Henrik Eriksson
 2020-21 –  Nicklas Bergfors
 2021-22 – The award was not given due to poor performance & relegation from SHL.

References

Djurgårdens IF Fotboll
Djurgårdens IF Hockey